Oksana Oleksandrivna Malaya (born 4 November 1983), better known as Oxana Malaya, is a Ukrainian woman internationally known for her dog-imitating behavior. Malaya has been the subject of documentaries, interviews and tabloid headlines as a feral child "raised by dogs".

Biography
Malaya was born in the village of Nova Blagovishchenka in Hornostaivka Raion, Kherson Oblast, of the Ukrainian SSR. According to doctors and medical records, she was a normal child at birth, but was later neglected by her alcoholic father at age three, and she lived surrounded by dogs. When Malaya was found by authorities, she was seven and a half years old, but she could not talk, lacked many basic skills, and physically behaved like a dog. She was running around on all fours, barking, slept on the floor, and she ate and took care of her hygiene like a dog. Malaya was removed from her parents' custody by social services.

Malaya was eventually transferred to the foster home for mentally-disabled children in Barabol (rural Ovidiopol Raion of Odessa Oblast). She underwent years of specialized therapy and education to address her behavioural, social and educational issues. Upon adulthood, Malaya was taught to subdue her dog-like behaviour; she learned to speak fluently and intelligibly and works at a farm milking cows, but remains somewhat intellectually impaired.

In a Channel 4 documentary, and in the Portuguese SIC channel documentary, her doctors stated that it is unlikely that she will ever be completely rehabilitated into "normal" society. In 2001, Russian TV channel "NTV" made a documentary about her life. There have been multiple articles about her in the press.

In 2013, Malaya gave an interview on national Ukrainian TV, on the talk-show Govorit Ukraina, where she talked about herself and answered questions. During the show, Malaya said that she wants to be treated like a normal human being, and is offended when others call her a "dog-girl". She said that she wants her brothers to visit her more often and that her main dream in her life is to find her biological mother. She also talked about her boyfriend, her life in the state foster home and her work with animals on the farm.

See also
Feral child
Genie (feral child)

References

External links
Oxana talks about her life on the Ukrainian TV talk-show "Govorit Ukraina" (2013)
Повторившая судьбу маугли 17-летняя воспитанница одесского интерната оксана малая совсем не обижается, когда ее называют девочкой-собакой - 2001 article in Fakty i kommentarii tabloid 
У героини публикации «фактов» оксаны малой, которая выросла в… Собачьей конуре, нашлись родной брат и маленькая племянница, тоже оксана - 2003 follow-up article in Fakty i kommentarii 
Daily Telegraph article
Animal Planet Raised Wild documentary (geo locked)

1983 births
Living people
People from Kherson Oblast
Feral children
Canids and humans
Ukrainian people with disabilities